The Saturday Mountain Formation is a geologic formation in Idaho and Iowa.

It preserves fossils dating back to the Ordovician period.

See also

 List of fossiliferous stratigraphic units in Idaho
 List of fossiliferous stratigraphic units in Iowa

References
 

Ordovician Idaho
Ordovician Iowa
Ordovician System of North America
Ordovician southern paleotropical deposits